Harpalus lederi is a species of ground beetle in the subfamily Harpalinae. It was described by Tschitscherne in 1899.

References

lederi
Beetles described in 1899